is a Japanese football player. He plays for Fagiano Okayama. His regular playing position is as an attacker.

Career
Haruto Shirai joined J1 League club Gamba Osaka in 2018 having spent the previous season playing for Gamba U-23 in the J3 League and was handed the number 37 jersey.

He didn't feature at all for Gamba's senior team in 2018, however he played 21 times, 1 start and 20 substitute appearances, for Gamba U-23.   He netted 3 goals in those 21 games adding to the 2 times he scored in 18 appearances in 2017.

Career statistics

Last update: 2 December 2018

Reserves performance

Last Updated: 11 June 2018

References

External links

1999 births
Living people
Association football people from Osaka Prefecture
People from Hirakata
Japanese footballers
J1 League players
J3 League players
Gamba Osaka players
Gamba Osaka U-23 players
Association football forwards